The Great Lakes Hockey League (GLHL) is a Semi Professional  ice hockey league that is affiliated with USA Hockey. Players must be at least 18 years of age and most have previous NCAA College, Junior A or Professional hockey experience. There are currently nine teams in the league divided into two divisions. The teams are all based in Wisconsin and the Upper Peninsula of Michigan.

History

The league was formed in 1937 as the Badger State Hockey League.

The 1998-99 Portage Lake Pioneers hold the record for best regular season at 25–1. They also went undefeated in the playoffs and national championships.

GLHL added a tenth team in the Marquette Iron Rangers, who began play during the 2015–16 season. The club played just one season, before they were replaced by the Marquette Mutineers in the fall of 2016.

League Format
The league is made up of nine teams that play a 20-game schedule running from October to March. Each GLHL game consists of three 20 minute periods. If the game is tied after regulation, there is a 5-minute overtime and if still tied a 4-round shootout.

Following the regular season is the playoff tournament. Teams are seeded in three pools based on regular season standings. Teams play one game against each team in their pool. The team with the best record in each pool advances to the semi-final. Of the remaining teams, the team with the greatest goal differential in pool play advances to the semi-finals as the wild card. In the event all teams in the same pool finish with a 1–1 record, the team with the greatest goal differential will advance to the semi-finals. The winners of the two semi-final games play for the championship. In the event a game is tied after overtime, additional overtime periods will be played until there is a winner.

Tournaments

Gibson Cup 
Annual three-game series between long-time Michigan rivals Calumet Wolverines and the Portage Lake Pioneers. Named in honor of "Doc" Jack Gibson, the Gibson Cup was first awarded in 1939; it is the third oldest hockey trophy in the United States.

Keevin Cup 
An annual four-team pre-season tournament hosted by the Fond du Lac Bears, the Keevin Cup honors Kevin Ristau, a long-time club board member and ambassador. The tournament takes place in late October.

Paper Cup 

An annual competition between the Fox Cities Ice Dogs and the Mosinee Papermakers. The winner is determined by whichever team wins the most head to head matches against one another (goal differential is a factor). The Cup gets its name from the two teams' cities' deep roots in the paper industry.

River Cup Series 

The River Cup Series is a two game series between the Eagle River Falcons and the Mosinee Papermakers. The Cup is awarded to the team that holds the greater goal differential at the end of both games.

Teams

Former teams 
 Wausau Cyclones (?-1999)
 Milwaukee Flyers (?-2005)
 Kenosha Knights (2005–07)
 Waupun Wolves (2001–09)
 Oregon Stampede (2009–10)
 Green Bay Hornets (2010–11)
 Brookfield Battalion (2010–12)
 Oregon Outlaws (2010–12)
 Vernon Hills Capitals (2008–13)
 Madison Blues (2008-2014)
 Madison Capitols (2003-2004)
 Marquette Iron Rangers (2015–16)
 Monroe Blues (2014–18)
 Stoughton Steel (2004-2007)
 West Bend Bombers (2007-2022)

Champions

References

External links 
 GLHL
 Gibson Cup
 USA Hockey - adult hockey

Ice hockey leagues in the United States
Ice hockey in Wisconsin
Ice hockey in Michigan